Archibald M. Kennedy House is a historic home located near Rushville, Indiana in Rushville Township, Rush County, Indiana.  It was built in 1864 by Archibald M. Kennedy, and is a two-story, five bay, painted brick Italianate style dwelling.  It has a gable roof and pediment and -story rear wing.  It features a two-story front porch supported by square columns and arched supports and arched openings.

It was listed on the U.S. National Register of Historic Places in 1983, as part of a multiple property submission covering six bridges built by the Kennedy family firm.

References

Houses on the National Register of Historic Places in Indiana
Italianate architecture in Indiana
Houses completed in 1864
Buildings and structures in Rush County, Indiana
National Register of Historic Places in Rush County, Indiana